Mount Handsley is a subsidiary rock peak on the Knobhead massif in Victoria Land, Antarctica. It was named in 1969 by the New Zealand Antarctic Place-Names Committee after Jesse Handsley, a member of the Discovery crew of Captain Robert Falcon Scott's expedition, who accompanied Scott, Evans, Feather, Skelton and Lashly on the major sledging journey up the Ferrar and Taylor Glaciers in 1903.

References

Mountains of Victoria Land
Scott Coast